WTYD (92.3 FM) is an adult album alternative formatted broadcast radio station licensed to Deltaville, Virginia, serving the Northern Neck. WTYD is owned and operated by Local Voice Media Group.

Repeaters
These stations simulcast WTYD full-time for the time being.

References

External links
107.9 & 92.3 The Tide Online

TYD
Adult album alternative radio stations in the United States
Radio stations established in 1999
1999 establishments in Virginia